Gilles Deusings (born 17 November 1997) is a Belgian professional footballer who most recently played as a goalkeeper for Eerste Divisie club MVV Maastricht.

Career
Born in Dalhem, Deusings started his career at C.S. Visé before playing for Alemannia Aachen II and R.F.C. Seraing. He joined MVV Maastricht on trial on 16 August 2017, before signing for the club on a permanent basis two weeks later. He signed a one-year contract extension with the club in June 2018 on a one-year contract. In April 2019, his contract with the club was extended by one year, and he made his debut for the club shortly after in a 1–1 Eerste Divisie draw at home to NEC Nijmegen on 3 May 2020.

Career statistics

References

Living people
1997 births
Belgian footballers
Belgian expatriate footballers
Association football goalkeepers
People from Dalhem
Footballers from Liège Province
C.S. Visé players
Alemannia Aachen players
R.F.C. Seraing (1922) players
MVV Maastricht players
Challenger Pro League players
Belgian Third Division players
Eerste Divisie players
Expatriate footballers in the Netherlands
Belgian expatriate sportspeople in the Netherlands
Expatriate footballers in Germany
Belgian expatriate sportspeople in Germany